is a  mountain of Tanzawa Mountains, located on the border of Kiyokawa, Hadano and Yamakita in Kanagawa, Japan.

Outline 
Mount Tō is one of the most popular mountains in Tanzawa Mountains. This mountain is a part of Tanzawa-Ōyama Quasi-National Park with other Tanzawa Mountains.

Access 
 Ōkura Bus Stop of Kanagawa Chūō Bus

Gallery

References
 Ministry of Environment of Japan
 Official Home Page of the Geographical Survey Institute in Japan
 ‘Tanzawa’, Yama to Kogen sha

Tonodake
Kiyokawa, Kanagawa
Hadano, Kanagawa
Yamakita, Kanagawa